David M. Bader is an author and former attorney.

Early life, family and education

Bader is a graduate of Harvard College and Harvard Law School.

Career
Bader was an attorney, and he worked at two law firms, but he eventually focused instead on his career as a writer.

His first book was How to Be an Extremely Reform Jew (Avon Books, 1994). Other works include The Book of Murray: The Life, Teachings, and Kvetching of the Lost Prophet (Harmony Books, 2010), Haiku U.: From Aristotle to Zola: Great Books in 17 Syllables (Gotham Books, 2004), Haikus for Jews: For You a Little Wisdom (Harmony Books, 1999), Zen Judaism: For You a Little Enlightenment (Harmony Books, 2002). He has contributed to the Mirth of a Nation humor anthologies.

In popular culture
Tom Magliozzi read selections from two of Bader's books Haikus for Jews and Zen Judaism on NPR's radio program Car Talk.

Excerpts from Bader's books have been widely circulated on the web and in e-mail, in most cases without permission.  As William Novak notes, "his work has been all over the Internet without attribution."

Personal life
David M. Bader resides and works in New York City.

References

External links 
 
 

Jewish American writers
Jewish poets
Jewish humorists
Harvard Law School alumni
Living people
Harvard College alumni
Year of birth missing (living people)
21st-century American Jews